Francesca Annis (born 14 May 1945) is an English actress. She is known for television roles in Reckless (1998), Wives and Daughters (1999), Deceit (2000), and Cranford (2007). A six-time BAFTA TV Award nominee, she won the 1979 BAFTA TV Award for Best Actress for the ITV serial Lillie. Her film appearances include Krull (1983), Dune (1984), The Debt Collector (1999), and The Libertine (2004).

Early life and education
Annis was born in Kensington, London in 1945, to an English father, Lester William Anthony Annis (1914–2001) and a Brazilian-French mother, Mariquita (Mara) Purcell (1913–2009). Both were sometime actors and Mara a sometime singer. Mara was from a wealthy Brazilian family. The Annises moved to Brazil when Francesca was one year old, and spent six years there, returning to England when she was seven. In recollecting the years in Brazil, she described her parents as running "a nightclub on Copacabana beach", and her mother Mara "performing as a blues singer".

Annis was educated at a convent school, and trained in her early years as a ballet dancer, with training in the Russian style at the Corona Stage Academy.

Career
Annis began acting professionally in her teens, and made her film debut in The Cat Gang (1959). Her first major film role was as Elizabeth Taylor's handmaiden in Cleopatra (1963), in which she was cast at the age of 16 while still studying Russian ballet. Her big break was as one of the leads in the 1965 West End stage musical Passion Flower Hotel. She played Estella in a television adaptation of Great Expectations (1967) and presented children's television programmes. She garnered attention for her performance as Lady Macbeth in Roman Polanski's film version of Macbeth (1971) in which she performs the sleepwalking soliloquy nude. The critic Kenneth Tynan was present when the scene was shot:"Francesca does it very sportingly and with no fuss ... though of course the set is closed, great curtains are drawn around the acting area ... and the wardrobe mistress rushes to cover Francesca with a dressing gown the instant Roman says, 'Cut'".

Annis played the "Widow of the Web" in the 1983 science fantasy film Krull, and starred as Lady Jessica in the 1984 David Lynch science fiction film Dune. 

She appeared as Tuppence with James Warwick as Tommy in The Secret Adversary (1983) and the subsequent series, Agatha Christie's Partners in Crime (1983–84). Annis played Jacqueline Kennedy in Onassis: The Richest Man in the World in 1988. She portrayed Mrs Wellington in the second film and directorial debut by Prince, Under The Cherry Moon (1986).

Annis pursued a stage career, playing leading roles with the Royal Shakespeare Company, such as Luciana in Trevor Nunn's musical version of The Comedy of Errors (1976) and Juliet in Romeo and Juliet alongside Ian McKellen (1977). 

At the National Theatre in 1981, she played Natalya Petrovna in Peter Gill's production of Ivan Turgenev's A Month in the Country. At the Comedy Theatre between September 2005 and January 2006, Annis starred as Ruth in Epitaph for George Dillon with Joseph Fiennes. She returned to the stage in April 2009, to star as Mrs Conway in Rupert Goold's National Theatre revival of J. B. Priestley's Time and the Conways.

She appeared in television productions in the 1970s, 1980s and 1990s in series such as Edward the Seventh (1975) as Lillie Langtry, a role she reprised in Lillie (1978); Madame Bovary (1975); and Parnell and the Englishwoman (1991), in which she played Kitty O'Shea; as well as the miniseries Reckless (1998) and its 2000 sequel. Annis co-starred with Sir Michael Gambon and Dame Judi Dench as Lady Ludlow (an aristocrat opposed to the education of the lower classes) in the BBC1 costume-drama series Cranford (2007). More recently, Annis played a leading role in the ITV drama Home Fires.

Personal life
Annis was in a relationship with photographer Patrick Wiseman that began in 1974, raising three children, Charlotte, Taran, and Andreas. Annis began a relationship with Hamlet co-star Ralph Fiennes in 1995, ending her 23-year relationship with Wiseman in 1997; Fiennes in turn divorced his wife of four years, Alex Kingston. Annis is said to have "apologised to Wiseman" over their parting. Annis and Fiennes announced their separation on 7 February 2006, after 11 years together, in a parting described as "acrimonious", following rumours that he had had an affair with the Romanian singer Cornelia Crisan.

At age 64, in an interview with Tim Auld of The Telegraph in 2009, Annis described herself as being one that tends "to forget the bad things – I don't dwell on them. I think, 'Oh, f– it, life's too short'" and that though single, she "believes it is better to be with someone than alone", stating "I think you live a fuller life... to have someone else's input on anything – a book, a meal, your children, life, a walk – is fantastic" and expressing optimism as she looked to her future, stating "'I like to have a big open canvas. I am a glass-half-full person. Something will turn up, you know, and whatever it is it'll be fine'".

Filmography

Selected stage appearances
 1976 Shakespeare's The Comedy of Errors as Luciana, with the Royal Shakespeare Company (RSC)
 1977 Shakespeare's Romeo and Juliet as Juliet, with the RSC
 1995 Shakespeare's Hamlet as Gertrude, with the Almeida Theatre at the Hackney EmpireHamlet (1995): Almeida Theatre Company, Hackney Empire | BBA Shakespeare
 2001 Ibsen's Ghosts as Helen Alving (28th March-14th July 2001) at the Comedy Theatre, London.
 1981 Ivan Turgenev's A Month in the Country as Natalya Petrovna, with the National Theatre
 2005 John Osborne and Anthony Creighton's Epitaph for George Dillon as Ruth, at the Comedy Theatre
 2009 J. B. Priestley's Time and the Conways as Mrs. Conway, with the National Theatre

Selected television appearances

Awards and nominations

References

External links

Living people
1945 births
20th-century English actresses
21st-century English actresses
Actresses from London
Best Actress BAFTA Award (television) winners
British actors of Latin American descent
English film actresses
English people of Brazilian descent
English people of French descent
English stage actresses
English television actresses
People from Kensington
Royal Shakespeare Company members